Nahr-e Sen (also known as Golshān, Rūstā-ye Sen, and Sen) is a village in Nasar Rural District, Arvandkenar District, Abadan County, Khuzestan Province, Iran. At the 2006 census, its population was 321, in 74 families.

References 

Populated places in Abadan County